Wu Chau is an uninhabited island of Hong Kong, located in Three Fathoms Cove, in Tai Po District.

Wu Chau is connected to the mainland near Tseng Tau via a tombolo.

See also

 List of islands and peninsulas of Hong Kong

Further reading
 

Tai Po District
Tombolos
Uninhabited islands of Hong Kong